The National Library of Malaysia (Malay: Perpustakaan Negara Malaysia) (PNM) is a library established under the National Library Act 1972 in Kuala Lumpur, Malaysia.

The National Library is responsible for providing a collection of knowledge at national level for the present and future generations. In its effort to strengthen the library's collection, the National Library continues to play an active role in its acquisition of library materials through enforcement of the Deposit of Library Material Act 1986, acquisition, gift and exchange.

The pride of the National Library's collection is the Malaysiana Collection. It comprises library materials published in Malaysia and overseas whose whole or larger part of the content is related to the publications date or the language used. Another national intellectual heritage is the Malay Manuscripts and one of her manuscript the Hikayat Hang Tuah has been acknowledged by UNESCO in the Memory of the World Register. It is a MS ISO 9001:2008 certified library.

Function 
The main function of the National Library of Malaysia is divided into three (3) main activity that is Management Activity, Library Development Activity and Information Services Activity. Each Activities supported by sub-activity or division to achieve its goals and objectives of the National Library of Malaysia.

(a) Management Activity
 Management and Human Resource
 Planning and Corporate Communications
(b) Library Development Activity
 Information Knowledge Network
 National Collection Development and Documentation
(c) Library Services Activity
 Malaysiana Services
 General Information Services
 PERDANA Services

Collection 

The National Library holds a total collection of 4.78 million units; of which 4.52 million are printed materials, 98,406 are non-printed materials, 4,974 are Malay manuscripts and 158,316 are digital materials.

The major role of a National Library is to preserve and expand the use of published collection from within a respective country as well as collection published in other countries that relates to it. As the National Library for Malaysia, this institution is the central repository for Malaysia's historical memory and culture as well as a library that stores, documentation and conserve intellectual achievement that has been translated into print and non-print form. The Malaysiana collection is a collection of national heritage and the Malaysian race.

The National Library collection consists the following:

 Malaysiana Collection (e.g.: Ephemeral Collection, Private Collection, etc.);
 Non-Malaysiana Collection (e.g.: ASEAN Collection, Harvard Collection, United Nations Collection, etc.);
 Malay Manuscripts Collection;
 Rare Collection;
 Serials Collection (e.g.: magazines, newspapers, journals, etc.);
 Electronic Media Collections;
 Commercial databases.

Malay Manuscript Collection 
Malay Manuscript is defined as a handwritten document in the Malay language in the Jawi script which surfaced in the beginning of the fourteenth century and ended in early twentieth century. It is an invaluable documentary heritage of the past which should be saved, stored and preserved. Since the early days when the Malays first learned how to write and particularly during the period when Islam penetrated into the Malay world, thousands of Malay manuscripts were produced covering a wide range of subjects spanning from literature encompassing prose and poem, history, religious Islamic teachings, law, medicine, beliefs and premonitions to court customs and administration reflecting the rich cultural heritage and high intellectual attainment of the Malays.

Malay Manuscript Reference Service is located at the Centre of Malay Manuscript, 11th floor of Menara PNM, National Library of Malaysia. They serve the best quality of manuscript to the scholars for doing the research and referral with the friendly and convenience atmosphere. Basically, the referral towards Malay Manuscripts collection more focus on the original one and microfilm copies with the permission and guidance by the reader advisory staff. Apart from the Malay manuscripts collection, NLM also provide the manuscripts in microfilms form from the other institution including in the country and overseas. Any photocopies from microfilm are provided with a charge.

Rare Collection 
Rare collection includes materials issued from within and outside the country published before 1900 and / or materials that have been printed out and is no longer available on the market. This collection covers a variety of subjects such as history, language, literature, social sciences, economics, religion, etc. It contains a source of knowledge in the form of books, pamphlets and photographs which is rare, valuable and scarce. Rare Collection is located in

Ephemeral Collection 
The Ephemeral collection was started in 1995 and is located in the Special Collection Room on Level 8, Menara PNM. It consists of publications from various departments and ministries, including postcards, brochures, program books, posters, calendars, first day stamps and envelopes.

Private Collection 
The Private Collection was started in 1994, containing information on historical figures. This collection is a compilation of individual works or private collections of notable figures covering various subjects such as arts and literature, history, architecture, religion, culture and others. Private collection acquired by the National Library of Malaysia is used for conservation and reference. The field items materials are collected according to favorites, interests or areas of the collection owner. Private collection that available at the National Library of Malaysia are books, journals, articles, manuscripts, documents, pamphlets, genealogy, photos, letters, newspaper clippings, files, drawings, charts, and brochures. All of these collections can be referred at Level 10, Menara PNM. The collections were obtained from well-known figures including John Bastin, A. Halim Nasir, Abdul Rahman Al-Ahmadi, Che Ismail Che Daud, Pak Sako, Aziz Jahpin, Cerita Cina Peranakan, Abdul Karim Abdullah, Mohd Idris Kamaruddin, Naharuddin Haji Ali and A. Samad Said.

Electronic Media Collection 
This is a resource collection of non-printed materials in various subject fields and formats such as audio cassettes, audio disc, video cassette, video disc, digital video disc, data compact disc (CD-ROM) and kits that are published in Malaysia and overseas. This collection is available at the Digital Services Section, Central Block on Level 4 of PNM Building (Anjung Bestari).

ASEAN Collection 
ASEAN (Association of Southeast Asian Nations) Collection consists of a collection of countries in Southeast Asia, which are the members of ASEAN including Malaysia, Singapore, Indonesia, Thailand, Philippines, Cambodia, Laos, Myanmar, Brunei Darussalam and Vietnam. This collection covers various fields and things of ASEAN country such as social, cultural, economic, political and national heritage building. This collection is located at the Centre Block on Level 4 of National Library of Malaysia Building.

Harvard Collection 
Materials in this collection consist of books, serial publications and media resources. This collection covers materials published by Harvard University Press, Harvard Business School and Harvard Business Publishing. This Harvard Collection is located on Level 4 of the PNM Building.

United Nations Collection 
National Library of Malaysia is the depository centre for United Nation publications since 1976. Its agencies such as United Nations Educational, Scientific and Cultural Organization (UNESCO), Food and Agriculture Organization of the United Nations (FAO), United Nations Children´s Fund (UNICEF) and others. This collection consists of books, serial publications, proceedings, prospectus, news bulletins and brochures. In February 2011, NLM was appointed to be the depository centre for United Nation. Special Collections of United Nations Organization can be referred to at Level 4 of Anjung Bestari.

Building 

The building design and concept reflecting Malaysian identity that symbolises intellectual achievement plus inspiration from the national's rich cultural heritage. The concept of the mind lends its touch in the architecture of the interior. The design is based on the concept of the traditional Malay headgear the tengkolok which is a symbol of intellectual pride and respect in Malaysian culture. The tiles on the roof are also unique containing patterns inspired by the Kain Songket (traditional hand woven cloth).

The architectural firm responsible for the design of the National Library of Malaysia's building at Jalan Tun Razak, Kuala Lumpur is Kumpulan Akitek.

Access
rapidKL bus 402 or Go KL Orange Line from  LRT/Monorail Titiwangsa.

References

External links

 
 NLM Library Catalogue

Federal ministries, departments and agencies of Malaysia
Public libraries in Malaysia
Malaysia
Buildings and structures in Kuala Lumpur
1966 establishments in Malaysia
Libraries established in 1966
Deposit libraries
Ministry of Tourism, Arts and Culture (Malaysia)